Band Ja Naimon! MAXX NAKAYOSHI ( バンドじゃないもん！MAXX NAKAYOSHI, commonly abbreviated as BanMon, formerly known as Band Ja Naimon!) is a Japanese girl group, which consists of six members Misako Suzuki, Ringo Koishio, Gumi Nanase, Miyu Mochizuki, Yuzu Amanatsu, and Sunrise Omomoko. The group has signed with the label Pony Canyon. Misako is also the drummer for the band Shinsei Kamattechan. The name of the group literally means "we are not a band!"  In 2016, their album "Kimemaster! / Kimochi Dake Sanka Shimasu" charted at #7 in the weekly Oricon Singles Chart. On January 28, 2017, the group was introduced at billboard as "Japan Hot 100 artist" for the first time.

History 
Band Ja Naimon was formed in 2011 when Misako Suzuki, drummer for the band Shinsei Kamattechan, met Saori Kaneko. Saori knew how to play the drums and wanted to join a band, and Misako wanted to be part a girl band. The two decided to create a “twin-drum” band soon after meeting. On February of the same year, the two held their first live performance as Band Ja Naimon. Initially they asked other musicians to support them on stage with other instruments, but later decided that only the two would perform with both members playing drums and singing. The two of them were reluctant to change from a band to an idol group, but were encouraged by seeing other idol groups. They eventually made the transition as their songs changed. They released their self-titled debut album on October 3, 2012, under Warner Music Japan's label, unBORDE.

On May 7, 2013, the two members held a livestream announcing the addition of three new members: Ramune Mizutama, Ringo Koishio, and Gumi Nanase. Their official introduction as a five-person group was at the live performance on June 8 of that same year.

Kaneko announced in August 2013 she would be graduating from the group to prepare for her marriage. Her graduation concert was held on September 19, 2013, marking the end of the “twin-drum” era. At the end of the concert, the addition of a new member was announced to be revealed in October and formally join the group at their concert on October 18, 2013. The new member would also be appearing on the cover of their next single “Yuki Furu Yoruni Kisushite”. On October 17, Miyu Mochizuki was revealed as the new member and group bass player.

On February 22, 2014, Mizutama announced her retirement from the group stating that the group's activities were conflicting with her personal activities and pursuits of other interests. At the same time, the group opened auditions for the first time in search of new members. Ramune graduated from the group on April 4, 2014. That same day, Yuzu Amanatsu and Omoko Sunrise (known as Momoko Amaterasu at the time) were announced as the new members. The official fan club, Chocolat Club, was founded on February 6, 2015. They renamed the group to Band Ja Naimon! MAXX NAKAYOSHI on November 9, 2018.

Members

Timeline

Discography 
※Following the official discography

Singles 
※The ranks follow the weekly Oricon Singles Chart

Digital Download

Albums 
※The ranks follow the weekly Oricon Albums Chart

Best-Of Albums

Filmography

References

External links 
 

Musical groups established in 2011
2011 establishments in Japan
Japanese girl groups